Florian Marku is an Albanian professional boxer and former kickboxer and mixed martial artist. He has held the IBF International welterweight title since September 2021, and the WBC welterweight title since August 2022.

Professional boxing career
Marku made his professional debut on 1 December 2018, scoring a first-round technical knockout (TKO) victory against Nikola Janicievic at the Beste Event Halle in Ulm, Germany.

In November 2020, after compiling a record of 7–0 (5 KOs), he signed a promotional contract with Eddie Hearn's Matchroom Sport. The following month, Marku faced Jamie Stewart at The SSE Arena in London. The bout served as part of the undercard for Anthony Joshua vs. Kubrat Pulev and was televised live on Sky Sports Box Office. In a fight which saw Marku drop his opponent to the canvas with a punch to the body in the second round, the result was controversially announced as a draw, with referee Marcus McDonnell scoring the bout 76–76.

Marku returned to The SSE Arena for his next fight, facing Rylan Charlton on 20 February 2021. Marku boxed well and controlled a lot of the fight but suffered a knockdown in the sixth round from a right hand by Charlton, Marku went on to secure an eighth-round TKO after Charlton's corner threw in the towel after their charge was on the receiving end of a sustained attack by Marku.

Marku had been scheduled to challenge IBF International welterweight champion Maxim Prodan on 7 August 2021 as part of Matchroom's Fight Camp, but the fight was postponed when Marku suffered an injury. On 25 August, it was announced that the bout would now take place on 25 September at Tottenham Hotspur Stadium on the undercard of Anthony Joshua vs. Oleksandr Usyk which he won via split decision after 10 rounds against Maxim Prodan.

Professional boxing record

References

External links

Living people
Year of birth missing (living people)
Date of birth missing (living people)
Albanian male boxers
Albanian male mixed martial artists
Sportspeople from Lushnjë
Welterweight boxers